The 1998 Suzuka 1000 km was the nineteenth running of the 1000km Suzuka and the sixth round the 1998 FIA GT Championship season.  It took place at the Suzuka Circuit, Japan, on August 23, 1998.

GT500 and GT300 class cars from the All-Japan Grand Touring Car Championship (JGTC) were allowed to participate on an exhibitional basis, but were not allowed to score points in the FIA GT Championship.

Official results
Class winners are in bold.  Cars failing to complete 70% of winner's distance are marked as Not Classified (NC).

† – #110 Ability was disqualified for failing to respond to a black flag.

Statistics
 Pole position – #1 AMG Mercedes – 1:52.580
 Fastest lap – #7 Porsche AG – 1:56.416
 Average speed – 172.405 km/h

References

 
 

S
Suzuka 1000